Mitophyllus is a genus of large stag beetles endemic to New Zealand.

Species
Mitophyllus alboguttatus
Mitophyllus angusticeps
Mitophyllus arcuatus
Mitophyllus dispar
Mitophyllus falcatus
Mitophyllus foveolatus
Mitophyllus fusculus
Mitophyllus gibbosus
Mitophyllus insignis
Mitophyllus irroratus
Mitophyllus macrocerus
Mitophyllus parrianus
Mitophyllus reflexus
Mitophyllus solox

See also
Taxonomy of Lucanidae

References 

Mitophyllus
Lucanidae genera
Beetles of New Zealand
Endemic fauna of New Zealand
Endemic insects of New Zealand